Manoj Abraham (born 3 June 1971) is an Indian Police Service officer and currently serving as Director of Vigilance and Anti-Corruption Bureau (VACB). He is a 1994 batch Indian Police Service (IPS) officer and has the rank of Additional Director General of Police. He was the nodal officer of Cyberdom, the cyber security initiative of the Kerala Police.

Career

Abraham joined the Indian Police Service as an officer in 1994, drawn on the Kerala Cadre. His first post was assistant superintendent of Police in the Adoor and Kasaragod sub-divisions. After being promoted in 1998, he was posted in Pathanamthitta district and Kollam district. He was subsequently transferred to Kannur for four years, and then to Kerala Police Headquarters as Assistant Inspector General of Police. He worked for seven years as the Commissioner of Police for Cochin and Thiruvananthapuram. Abraham also holds the position of Nodal Officer in the Kerala Police 'Cyber Dome'. Currently he is serving as ADGP in Kerala.

Awards and recognitions
Abraham has received awards for community policing initiatives and traffic reforms:

|-
! scope="row" | 2009
| Vocational Excellence Award
| Rotary International
| 
|-
! scope="row" | 2009
| International Community Policing Award 
| International Association of Chiefs of Police, USA
| 
| 
|
|-
! scope="row" | 2010
| Significant Achievement Award
| Rotary International
| 
| Notes
|
|-
! scope="row" | 2011
| Man of the Decade Award
| People's Forum of Kochi
| 
| For effective crime control and successful management of law and order in Kochi.
|
|-
! scope="row" | 2011
| Police Medal for meritorious service.
| Law enforcement in India
| 
| By the Indian President
|
|-
! scope="row" | 2020
| Technology Leadership award
| Kerala Management Association
| 
| By the Indian President
|

Published works
In 2012, Abraham co-edited the book Global Community Policing - Problems and Prospects, published by CRC Press.

References

1971 births
Living people
Indian Police Service officers
Malayali people
People from Thiruvananthapuram
Indian civil servants
Civil Servants from Kerala